Jashim Salam (born 1978) is a Bangladeshi documentary photographer and photojournalist.

Biography
Salam graduated in photography from  Pathshala the south Asian institute of photography and media academy. He has studied a post Graduation Diploma in Visual Journalism through a scholarship program of World Press Photo at the Konrad Adenauer Asian Center for Journalism (ACFJ) at Ateneo de Manila University in the Philippines.
He has been teaching, mentoring photography in workshops and seminars for aspiring young photographers regularly and has also been on the jury boards of numerous photography contests in Bangladesh. Social photo-documentary, portraits are among his interests.
He started his photographic career with DrikNEWS agency. He worked for New Age an English daily of Bangladesh, Drik picture agency, Majority world, Nur photo agency, and Corbis images.

His work has been featured in the exhibitions and screening worldwide, including Visa Pour l'Image, in Perpignan, The Photoville festival in New York, Berlin Parliament in Germany, Atrium of the Town Hall, The Hague, Netherlands, Maison familiale Pro Juventute, Geneva, The Getty Images Gallery, London, Gallery of the French Alliance Foundation Paris, France.

Awards
 2nd spotlight fotovisura grant, 2013 
 1st prize Gold, 3rd Asian Press Photo contest, 2012 
 1st prize in Emirates photography award, 2011 
 Ian Parry scholarship (Commended), 2011 
 OpenWalls Arles 2020 Winner

References

External links
 Jashim Salam Website

1978 births
Living people
Bangladeshi photographers
Bangladeshi journalists
Ateneo de Manila University alumni